Potbrood ("pot bread") is bread first made by the Boer settlers of what is now South Africa. Potbrood was traditionally baked in a cast-iron pot (also known as a Dutch oven) in a pit made in the ground and lined with hot coals. Today potbrood is often made at a braai by packing charcoal or wood coals around a cooking pot.

See also
 Potjiekos
 Braai
 List of African dishes

References

Breads
South African cuisine